Brynjar Kristinsson (born 21 January 1988) is an Icelandic cross-country skier. 

He represented Iceland at the FIS Nordic World Ski Championships 2015 in Falun.

References

External links 
 

1988 births
Living people
Brynjar Kristinsson